Johan August Anker (26 June 1871 – 2 October 1940) was a Norwegian sailor and yacht designer who competed in the 1908 Summer Olympics, in the 1912 Summer Olympics, and in the 1928 Summer Olympics.

Personal life
He was born at Refne in Berg, Østfold as a son of wholesaler Christian August Anker (1840–1912) and Christine Charlotte Friis (1848–1899). He was a grandson of landowner and politician Peter Martin Anker, and nephew of landowner and politician Nils Anker and school founder Herman Anker.

In March 1895 he married Julie Frederikke Jacobsen (1872–1962). Their son Christian August Anker, born 1896, was a businessman and their son Erik Anker, born 1903, also became a sailor and businessman. The marriage was later dissolved. In January 1910 he married his second wife, renowned feminist Nini Roll Anker (1873–1942). She had formerly been married to Johan's first cousin.

Sailing career
In 1908 he finished fourth as a crew member of the Norwegian boat Fram in the 8 metre class competition.

Four years later he was a crew member of the Norwegian boat Magda IX which won the gold medal in the 12 metre class. He returned to the Olympics in 1928 to win his second gold medal, this time in the 6 metre class. He did so as a crew member of Norna. This time his son was on the crew, so was Crown Prince Olav of Norway. They represented the Royal Norwegian Yacht Club. Anker chaired the Royal Norwegian Yacht Club from 1916 to 1919 and 1921 to 1925, and was a co-founder and first chairman of the Nordic Sailing Federation from 1915.

Yacht designer
In 1905 he bought into a small boat building yard named Jensens Yard. It became the famous Anker & Jensen Yard. Most of the boat designing was done by Anker and the boat building was done mostly by Jensen.

Johan Anker became an internationally recognized yacht designer after entering the 1908 Olympics, held that year in Great Britain. The sailing took place in the Solent and Johan Anker raced his 8mR Fram. He managed to secure second place in both races. A few years later Anker returned to the Solent for the 1911 Coronation Regatta, this time with the yacht Rollo, an 12mR design. This time Johan Anker sailed home to Norway with the gold medal. With the International Rule yachts quickly increasing in popularity on the international yacht racing scene, John Anker had established himself as a first class designer. With the long sleek and beautiful boats that Anker designed he soon became known as the “master of lines” not only in his home country but also in the rest of the world.

Except from designing several International Meter Rule yachts, the most noticeable design from John Anker is the Dragon from 1929. The Dragon became an Olympic class and is still today a fast-growing keel boat class that is raced in over 26 countries in 5 continents.

In 1915 Johan Anker parted with Jensen and the yard was taken over entirely by Anker who keep the name Anker & Jensen for the business.

Anker's 6mR, 8mR, 12mR designs excelled, but he also designed 15mRs Isabel-Alexandra (1913) and Neptune (1917), Q-Class Cotton Blossom II (1925), Figaro IV, Brand II and Noreine.

Anker died in October 1940, aged 69, and was buried at Oslo Western Civil Cemetery.

References

1871 births
1940 deaths
People from Halden
Johan
Norwegian male sailors (sport)
Sailors at the 1908 Summer Olympics – 8 Metre
Sailors at the 1912 Summer Olympics – 12 Metre
Sailors at the 1928 Summer Olympics – 6 Metre
Olympic sailors of Norway
Olympic gold medalists for Norway
Olympic medalists in sailing
Norwegian yacht designers
Burials at Vestre gravlund
Medalists at the 1912 Summer Olympics
Medalists at the 1928 Summer Olympics
Sportspeople from Viken (county)